Adolfo de Urquijo e Ibarra, Count of Urquijo (1866–1933) was an Alfonsist politician, deputy, president of the Biscay deputation, publisher, and expert in Basque culture and history.

External links
http://www.euskomedia.org/aunamendi/135053

1866 births
1933 deaths
Spanish monarchists
Members of the Congress of Deputies of the Spanish Restoration
Politicians from the Basque Country (autonomous community)
19th-century Spanish historians
20th-century Spanish male writers
Basque writers
People from San Sebastián
Spanish essayists
20th-century Spanish historians
People from Bilbao
Male essayists
19th-century male writers
19th-century essayists
20th-century essayists